A walk of fame is an outdoor tribute to notable individuals.

Walk of fame may also refer to:

 "Walk of Fame" (The Price is Right game), a former pricing game on the American game show The Price is Right
 Walk of Fame (film), a 2017 American comedy film

See also
 Walk of shame (disambiguation)